Coptopterygidae is a family of mantises in the order Mantodea. There are at least 2 genera and more than 20 described species in Coptopterygidae.

Genera
These two genera belong to the family Coptopterygidae:
 Brunneria Saussure, 1869 (Brunner's stick mantis)
 Coptopteryx Saussure, 1869

References

Further reading

 
 
 

Mantodea
Mantodea families